Midori Takahashi (高橋翠 Takahashi Midori, born March 10, 1980) is a Japanese volleyball player who played for Toyota Auto Body Queenseis.

Profiles
She became a volleyball player at 10 years old.
While attending Furukawashogyo High school, the volleyball team won the top of Japanese high school.
In June 2011, she retired and became the team stuff.

Clubs
Furukawashogyo High School → Nippon Sports Science Univ. →  Toyota Auto Body Queenseis(2002–2011)

National team
2002: Universiade National team
2006: 6th place in the World Championship in Japan

Awards

Team
2008 Empress's Cup -  Champion, with Toyota Auto Body.

References

External links
FIVB biography
Toyota Auto Body Queenseis Official Site

Japanese women's volleyball players
Living people
1980 births
Asian Games medalists in volleyball
Volleyball players at the 2006 Asian Games
Medalists at the 2006 Asian Games
Asian Games silver medalists for Japan